Lindsey Horner (born October 4, 1960, New York City) is an American jazz double-bassist.

Horner studied double bass at the Juilliard School of Music as well as musicology and philosophy at Trinity College (Dublin). He also took private lessons with Milt Hinton and Dave Holland. Since 1982 he has directed his own groups; his first two CDs Never No More (1991) and Mercy Angel (1995) were rated five out of five stars by Down Beat. In addition, he also recorded with Muhal Richard Abrams, Marty Ehrlich, Herb Robertson, Tom Varner, Bobby Previte,  and the New York Composer's Orchestra. He has performed with Pharoah Sanders, John Zorn, Joey Baron, Mark Feldman, Ray Anderson, and Don Byron. He also plays Irish music, with The Chieftains, the Bothy Band and Andy Irvine.

Discography
Never No More (OPEN MINDS 1991)			
Mercy Angel  (Upshot Records 1994)	
Believers (Koch Jazz 1997)	
Through The Bitter Frost And Snow (with Susan McKeown) (Prime CD 1997)	
Susan McKeown & Lindsey Horner - Mighty Rain with (Susan McKeown) (Depth Of Field 1998)		
Jewels & Binoculars (The Music Of Bob Dylan) (2003)		
Don't Count On Glory (Cadence Jazz Records 2005)		
Undiscovered Country (ArtistShare 2010)

With Myra Melford
Jump (Enemy, 1991)
Now & Now (Enemy, 1992)
Alive in the House of Saints (HatART, 1993)
Even the Sounds Shine (Hat ART, 1995)
With Joseph Jarman and Leroy Jenkins
Out of the Mist (Ocean, 1997)

References
 Martin Kunzler, Jazz Encyclopaedia, Vol. 1, Reinbek, 2002; 

American jazz double-bassists
Male double-bassists
Musicians from New York City
1960 births
Living people
Jazz musicians from New York (state)
21st-century American double-bassists
21st-century American male musicians
20th-century double-bassists
20th-century American male musicians
20th-century American musicians
Juilliard School alumni
Alumni of Trinity College Dublin
American male jazz musicians
Cadence Jazz Records artists
ArtistShare artists